Prem Kumar (born 21 March 1989 in Chennai, Tamil Nadu) is an Indian footballer who played as a defender for Air India FC in the I-League.

Career

Air India
After spending two seasons in the Mumbai youth team Kumar signed for I-League club Air India FC. On 27 March 2013 Kumar was sent-off against United Sikkim at the Paljor Stadium in the 31st minute as Air India went on to lose the match 5–0.

Career statistics

Club
Statistics accurate as of 12 May 2013

References

1989 births
Living people
Indian footballers
Tamil sportspeople
Mumbai FC players
Air India FC players
I-League players
Footballers from Chennai
Association football defenders